The Mengkofen Solar Park is a photovoltaic power station in Bavaria, Germany. It has an installed capacity of 21.78 megawatt (MW).

See also

Energy policy of the European Union
Renewable energy commercialization
Renewable energy in Germany
Renewable energy in the European Union

References

Photovoltaic power stations in Germany